Agaskhand is a village in Pathardi taluka, Ahmadnagar district of Maharashtra state in Indian territory.

Geography 
The village is located on intersection of Pathardi.

Education 

 Jilha Parishad Primary School
 Highschool and Jr. college.

References 

Villages in Pathardi taluka
Villages in Ahmednagar district